Jeotgalicoccus marinus is a species of Gram-positive, facultatively anaerobic bacteria. It is moderately halophilic, it grows in environments with 0.5–25.0 % total salts. The cells are coccoid. The species was isolated from a sea urchin (Hemicentrotus pulcherrimus) from the South China Sea.

Further reading

References

External links
Type strain of Jeotgalicoccus marinus at BacDive -  the Bacterial Diversity Metadatabase

marinus
Bacteria described in 2009